The 1974 Astro-Bluebonnet Bowl was an American college football bowl game that was played on December 23, 1974 at the Astrodome in Houston, Texas. It was the sixteenth edition of the Bluebonnet Bowl. The game matched the Houston Cougars against the NC State Wolfpack. It was the final contest of the 1974 NCAA Division I football season for both teams. The game ended in a 31–31 tie.

Teams
The game matched the Houston Cougars against the NC State Wolfpack of the Atlantic Coast Conference. The game was the first bowl game featuring the Cougars and the Wolfpack, and was their third overall meeting. The two teams had met twice before, with each team winning one against the other, and the teams' previous meeting was in 1969, when the Cougars defeated the Wolfpack 34–13.

NC State Wolfpack

The NC State Wolfpack of the ACC entered the game ranked 13 in the AP Poll. During the regular season, they had compiled a  record, including a  record against conference opponents; they placed second in their conference standings. The game represented the Wolfpack's first appearance in the Bluebonnet Bowl.

Houston Cougars

The conference-independent Cougars entered the game unranked in the AP Poll. The game represented the Cougars' fourth appearance in the Bluebonnet Bowl; their previous appearance was in the 1973 Astro-Bluebonnet Bowl, in which they defeated the Tulane Green Wave 47–7.

Game summary

Scoring summary

Source:

Statistics

References

Astro-Bluebonnet Bowl
Bluebonnet Bowl
NC State Wolfpack football bowl games
Houston Cougars football bowl games
Astro-Bluebonnet
Astro-Bluebonnet Bowl